Samford railway station was a railway station in Samford, Moreton Bay Region, Queensland,  Australia. It was located to the west of Station Street within the present-day John Scott Park.

History 
The station opened in 1918 as the terminus of the extension of the railway line to Samford.

References

Railway stations in Australia opened in 1918
Railway stations in Moreton Bay Region